Kelly Jeromy Willie (born September 7, 1982) is an American former track and field athlete who specialized in the 400-meter dash.

Born and raised in Houston, Texas, he attended Sterling High School and competed in track while there. Willie attended Louisiana State University and ran for their LSU Tigers team, being a three-time NCAA champion in the relay and the 400 m runner-up in 2004. He ran for the American 4×400-meter relay team at the 2004 Olympics, but only in the qualifying heats as Otis Harris and Jeremy Wariner were rested to be fully fit for the final.

With strong American 400 metre runners like Andrew Rock, Derrick Brew, Darold Williamson and Wariner (who constituted the gold-winning relay team at the 2005 World Championships), and even LaShawn Merritt, Jamel Ashley and Terry Gatson, Willie has faced extremely tough competition in terms of qualifying for major international events where only three participants from each state are allowed.

References

 
 

1982 births
Living people
Track and field athletes from Houston
American male sprinters
African-American male track and field athletes
Olympic gold medalists for the United States in track and field
Athletes (track and field) at the 2004 Summer Olympics
LSU Tigers track and field athletes
Medalists at the 2004 Summer Olympics
World Athletics Indoor Championships winners
21st-century African-American sportspeople
20th-century African-American people